Stari Ledinci also known simply as Ledinci is a suburban settlement of Petrovaradin, Novi Sad, Serbia. The population of Stari Ledinci numbered 823 people in the 2002 census. Most of the inhabitants of the village are ethnic Serbs.

Geography
The village is geographically located in Srem, but it is part of South Bačka District. There are two villages with this name: Stari Ledinci (Old Ledinci) and Novi Ledinci (New Ledinci). Today, the name "Ledinci" is officially used to designate Novi Ledinci, while other village is officially known as Stari Ledinci. Both villages are located in Petrovaradin municipality, on the brows of Fruška Gora mountain. Near the village of Stari Ledinci lies a Ledinci Lake, which is an important tourist destination.

History

The village was probably founded in the 13th century, during the administration of the Kingdom of Hungary . According to a record from 1372, the area near Ledinci was named "a Serb region", while according to the record from 1438, this territory was inhabited by "Schismatics" (Orthodox Christians).

According to the legend, the village of Ledinci was among the possessions of the Serbian despot Jovan Branković (1496–1502), who donated this village to the Rakovac Monastery. The ethnic Serb inhabitants of this part of Srem are also mentioned during the uprising of György Dózsa in 1514.

During the Ottoman rule, in the 17th century, a master of the village was Solak Mehmed-aga, an Ottoman spahija. Since the end of the 17th century, the village was under the administration of the Habsburg monarchy. The Habsburg authorities had problems with collecting taxes in the village, since, according to one tax report from the first half of the 18th century, the inhabitants of this region were Freie Ratzen ("free Serbs"), by the character very disobedient and defiant. They continually avoiding the contacts with the representatives of the authorities, thus it is very hard to deal with them".

Since 1918, the village was part of the Kingdom of Serbs, Croats and Slovenes. During the Second World War, the village was burned to the ground by the German fascists. After the war, the village was rebuilt, but on the new location, near the river Danube, and today this village is known as Novi Ledinci (New Ledinci). However, part of the population returned to the old location of the village, so the old village was rebuilt too, and today is known as Stari Ledinci (Old Ledinci).

Demographics

Gallery

See also
Novi Ledinci
Ledinci Lake
Fruška Gora
List of places in Serbia
List of cities, towns and villages in Vojvodina

References

Monografija Starih Ledinaca, Novi Sad, 1998.
Miloš Lukić, Ledinačke vatre, Novi Sad, 1982.

External links 

 Village of Stari Ledinci

Suburbs of Novi Sad
Populated places in Syrmia
South Bačka District